Boubaker El Bakouri (born 12 April 1994) is a Moroccan kickboxer and the finalist of the 2018 K-1 Cruiserweight Grand Prix.

Kickboxing career
In 2015 Boubaker participated in the A1 World Combat Cup Platinium. In the quarter finals, he won a unanimous decision against Bas Vorstenbosch. In the semi finals, he lost a decision to Ibrahim El Bouni.

El Bakouri had his first fight with Enfusion during Enfusion 45, when he fought Rustam Guseinov. He won the fight by a third round TKO.

El Bakouri participated in the 2018 K-1 Cruiserweight Grand Prix. He scored (T)KO wins over Makoto Uehara in the quarter finals and Hitoshi Sugimoto in the semi finals, and fought for the cruiserweight title against Sina Karimian. Boubaker lost the fight by majority decision.

Returning to Enfusion he lost to Mattia Faraoni by unanimous decision, Hicham El Gaoui through an injury in the first round.

Championships and accomplishments
K-1
2018 K-1 Cruiserweight Grand Prix Runner-up

Kickboxing record

|-  bgcolor=""
| 2023-02-11 || ||align=left| Andress van Engelen || Enfusion 118 || Nijmegen, Netherlands || ||  ||
|-  bgcolor="#cfc"
| 2022-09-24 || Win ||align=left| Steven van den Broek || Enfusion 112 || Eindhoven, Netherlands || Decision (Unanimous) || 3 || 3:00
|-  bgcolor="#fbb"
| 2019-11-02|| Loss ||align=left| Hicham El Gaoui || Enfusion 90 || Antwerp, Belgium || KO (Nose injury) || 3 ||
|-  bgcolor="#fbb"
| 2019-03-23 || Loss ||align=left| Mattia Faraoni || Enfusion 80 || Rome, Italy || Decision (Unanimous) || 3 || 3:00
|-  bgcolor="#fbb"
| 2018-09-24|| Loss ||align=left| Sina Karimian || 2018 K-1 Cruiserweight Grand Prix, Tournament Finals || Saitama, Japan || Decision (Majority) || 3 || 3:00
|-
! style=background:white colspan=9 |
|-  bgcolor="#cfc"
| 2018-09-24 || Win ||align=left| Hitoshi Sugimoto || 2018 K-1 Cruiserweight Grand Prix, Tournament Semi Finals || Saitama, Japan || TKO (2 Knockdown Rules) || 2 || 1:38
|-  bgcolor="#cfc"
| 2018-09-24 || Win ||align=left| Makoto Uehara || 2018 K-1 Cruiserweight Grand Prix, Tournament Quarter Finals || Saitama, Japan || KO (Punch) || 1 || 1:05
|-  bgcolor="#cfc"
| 2018-05-05|| Win ||align=left| Filip Verlinden || Enfusion 66 || Santa Cruz de Tenerife, Spain || Decision (Unanimous) || 3 || 3:00
|-  bgcolor="#cfc"
| 2018-04-14 || Win ||align=left| Rick de Kruijff || FIGHT NIGHT III || Alphen aan den Rijn, Netherlands || Decision (Unanimous) || 3 || 3:00
|-  bgcolor="#fbb"
| 2018-02-17|| Loss ||align=left| Vladislav Koshel || Enfusion 61 || Eindhoven, Netherlands || Decision || 3 || 3:00
|-  bgcolor="#fbb"
| 2017-10-27|| Loss ||align=left| Dawid Kasperski  || DSF KC: 11 || Warsaw, Poland || Decision || 3 || 3:00
|-  bgcolor="#fbb"
| 2017-03-18|| Loss ||align=left| Hicham El Gaoui  || Enfusion Live 47 & Kickboxing Talents 29, Tournament Finals || Nijmegen, Netherlands || Decision (Unanimous) || 3 || 3:00
|-  bgcolor="#cfc"
| 2017-03-18|| Win ||align=left| Youness Ben Malek  || Enfusion Live 47 & Kickboxing Talents 29, Tournament Semifinals|| Nijmegen, Netherlands || KO || 2 || 
|-  bgcolor="#cfc"
| 2017-02-18|| Win ||align=left| Noureddine Ajnaou  || Enfusion Talents 28 || Eindhoven, Netherlands || KO || 1 ||
|-  bgcolor="#cfc"
| 2016-09-12 || Win ||align=left| Rustam Guseinov  || Enfusion 45 || Abu Dhabi, United Arab Emirates || TKO || 3 || 2:22
|-  bgcolor="#cfc"
| 2016-05-14 || Win ||align=left| Tom Duivenvoorde  || Enfusion Rookies Nijmegen || Nijmegen , Netherlands || Decision (Unanimous) || 3 || 3:00
|-  bgcolor="#fbb"
| 2016-04-02 || Loss ||align=left| Hicham El Gaoui || Enfusion Gold Edition || The Hague, Netherlands || Decision (Unanimous) || 3 || 3:00
|-  bgcolor="#cfc"
| 2016-02-27 || Win ||align=left| Mustapha El Barbari  || Enfusion Talents 19 || Eindhoven, Netherlands || TKO (Punches) || 3 || 
|-  bgcolor="#fbb"
| 2015-05-16|| Loss ||align=left| Ibrahim El Bouni || A1 World Combat Cup Platinium, Tournament Semi Finals || Eindhoven, Netherlands || Decision (Unanimous) || 3 || 3:00
|-  bgcolor="#cfc"
| 2015-05-16|| Win ||align=left| Bas Vorstenbosch || A1 World Combat Cup Platinium, Tournament Quarter Finals || Eindhoven, Netherlands || Decision (Unanimous) || 3 || 3:00
|-  bgcolor="#cfc"
| 2014-11-22|| Win ||align=left| Kamil Krzysztof || Fight Night 2 || Bree, Belgium || Decision (Unanimous) || 3 || 3:00
|-  bgcolor="#cfc"
| 2014-09-27 || Win ||align=left| Ertugrul Bayrak || A1 World Combat Cup || Eindhoven, Netherlands || TKO || 3 ||
|-  bgcolor="#c5d2ea"
| 2014-06-21 || NC||align=left| Kamil Jemel || Quinn Gym Fight Night 2 || Venray, Netherlands || No Contest ||  || 
|-  bgcolor="#cfc"
| 2014-04-05 || Win ||align=left| || Judgement Day Part V || Panningen, Netherlands || Decision || 3 || 3:00
|-  bgcolor="#fbb"
| 2013-11-16 || Loss ||align=left| Tom De Smet || Glorious Heroes IV || Annen, Netherlands || KO (High Kick) || 1 || 
|-
|-  bgcolor="#cfc"
| 2013-05-21|| Win ||align=left| Roshan Nazari || Quinn Gym Fight Night || Venray, Netherlands || TKO (Punches) || 3 || 
|-
| colspan=9 | Legend:

See also
 List of male kickboxers

References

1994 births
Living people
Moroccan male kickboxers
Cruiserweight kickboxers
Sportspeople from Tilburg